Supersonic Festival may also refer to:

 Supersonic Festival (Seoul), an annual music festival in Seoul, South Korea
 Supersonic Festival (Birmingham), an annual music festival in Birmingham, England